Milo R. Lude (born June 30, 1922) is an American former football and baseball player, coach, and college athletics administrator. He played football and baseball at Hillsdale College, where he was a member of the Alpha Tau Omega fraternity. He served as the head coach at Colorado State University from 1962 to 1969, compiling a record of 29–51–1.  Lude was the head baseball coach at Hillsdale College from 1948 to 1949 and at the University of Maine from 1950 to 1951.  He served as the athletic director at Kent State University (1970–1976), the University of Washington (1976–1991), and Auburn University (1992–1994).

As athletic director at Kent State, Lude offered Don James his first head coaching job in 1971; the two later worked together for fifteen years at Washington.

Lude went skydiving for the first time at the age of 93. In 2021, Lude stated that he planned to do the same for his 100th birthday.

Head coaching record

Football

Notes

References

1922 births
Living people
Baseball catchers
Auburn Tigers athletic directors
Colorado State Rams football coaches
Delaware Fightin' Blue Hens football coaches
Hillsdale Chargers baseball coaches
Hillsdale Chargers baseball players
Hillsdale Chargers football coaches
Hillsdale Chargers football players
Kent State Golden Flashes athletic directors
Maine Black Bears baseball coaches
Maine Black Bears football coaches
Washington Huskies athletic directors
Sportspeople from Kalamazoo, Michigan
Players of American football from Michigan
Baseball players from Michigan
Coaches of American football from Michigan
Baseball coaches from Michigan
Men centenarians
American centenarians